Varfam (also Romanized as Varfām; also known as Varnām and Varpām) is a village in Zarem Rud Rural District, Hezarjarib District, Neka County, Mazandaran Province, Iran. At the 2006 census, its population was 101, in 25 families.

References 

Populated places in Neka County